
Gmina Skawina is an urban-rural gmina (administrative district) in Kraków County, Lesser Poland Voivodeship, in southern Poland.

Villages
Apart from the town of Skawina, Gmina Skawina contains the villages and settlements of Borek Szlachecki, Facimiech, Gołuchowice, Grabie, Jaśkowice, Jurczyce, Kopanka, Krzęcin, Ochodza, Polanka Hallera, Pozowice, Radziszów, Rzozów, Wielkie Drogi, Wola Radziszowska and Zelczyna.

Neighbouring gminas
Gmina Skawina is bordered by the city of Kraków and by the gminas of Brzeźnica, Czernichów, Kalwaria Zebrzydowska, Lanckorona, Liszki, Mogilany, Myślenice and Sułkowice.

References
Polish official population figures 2006

Skawina
Kraków County